The Hays County Courthouse is an historic courthouse located in San Marcos, Hays County, Texas. It was built in the Classical Revival style in 1908.  It is recognized by both the National Register of Historic Places and Texas Historical Commission.

See also

National Register of Historic Places listings in Hays County, Texas
List of county courthouses in Texas

References

External links

Hays County Official Website 
Texas Escapes - The Hays County Courthouse

Government buildings completed in 1908
Neoclassical architecture in Texas
Courthouses on the National Register of Historic Places in Texas
County courthouses in Texas
Buildings and structures in San Marcos, Texas
National Register of Historic Places in Hays County, Texas
1908 establishments in Texas